I Made (stylized in sentence case) is the second extended play by South Korean girl group (G)I-dle. The album was released digitally and physically on February 26, 2019. The album contains five tracks including the lead single, "Senorita", which was composed by member Soyeon and producer Big Sancho.

Background and release
On February 10, 2019, Cube Entertainment announced via SNS that the group would release their second mini-album, I Made on February 26, 2019.

On February 11, they released the schedule of promotion for the album. On February 13, track list were revealed. The album contains five songs with title track, "Senorita". Member Minnie participated in composing for the first time.

On February 20, an audio snippet was released and followed by video teasers.

The EP was released on February 26 through several music portals in South Korea, while the physical album was released the following day.

Promotion
Ahead of their comeback, cube released a special photo card which only can be purchased at 20Space.

(G)I-dle held a live showcase at Blue Square Samsung Card Hall in Hannam-dong, Seoul before the release of the EP on February 26, where they performed "Senorita" along with "Blow Your Mind". On the same day, they had a live broadcast on Naver V Live to celebrate their comeback with fans.

The group started promoting "Senorita" on February 27 on MBC Music Show Champion.

Music video
Before the last episode of To Neverland, (G)I-dle release a self-directed music video for Minnie composed song "Blow Your Mind" on February 19. The music video was released through M2 channel.

On February 26, "Senorita" was released along with its music video. The music video surpassed five million views within 21 hours of its release.

Track listing

Charts

Weekly charts

Monthly chart

Year-end charts

Sales

Release history

References

External links

2019 EPs
Cube Entertainment EPs
(G)I-dle EPs
Korean-language EPs
Albums produced by Jeon So-yeon
Albums produced by Minnie (singer)